The Wolf River is a river on Axel Heiberg Island in Qikiqtaaluk Region, Nunavut, Canada. It flows to the Arctic Ocean.

The river begins at Black Crown Glacier on the slopes of Wolf Mountain, flows south, then turns southwest to reach its mouth at Expedition Fjord, adjacent to the mouth of the Expedition River. Expedition Fjord connects via Strand Bay and the Sverdrup Channel to the Arctic Ocean.

See also  
List of rivers of Nunavut
List of rivers of the Americas by coastline

References

Rivers of Qikiqtaaluk Region